Sekal Has to Die is a 1998 Czech film directed by Vladimír Michálek. It was the Czech Republic's submission to the 71st Academy Awards for the Academy Award for Best Foreign Language Film, but was not accepted as a nominee.

The plot takes place in the small Moravian village during World War II.

Cast
 Bogusław Linda as Ivan Sekal
 Olaf Lubaszenko as Jura Baran
 Agnieszka Sitek as Agnieszka
 Jiří Bartoška as Priest
 Vlasta Chramostová as Mari
 L'udovít Cittel as Runt

See also
 Cinema of the Czech Republic
 List of submissions to the 71st Academy Awards for Best Foreign Language Film
 List of Czech submissions for the Academy Award for Best Foreign Language Film

References

External links
 

1998 films
1990s war drama films
Czech war drama films
Czech resistance to Nazi occupation in film
Czech Lion Awards winners (films)
Films scored by Michał Lorenc
1998 drama films
Czech World War II films
1990s Czech-language films